VF-121 (Fighter Squadron 121) of the US Navy was a former Pacific Fleet Replacement Air Group (RAG) unit. Originally established on 1 July 1946, as VF-781, it was redesignated as VF-121 on 4 February 1953 and disestablished on 30 September 1980. On 11 April 1958 it changed duty from Fleet Squadron to Fleet Replacement Squadron and was later charged with the training of Navy F-4 Phantom flight and maintenance crews.

Operational history

Fighting Squadron
On July 1, 1946, VF-781, The Pacemakers were stationed at Naval Air Station Los Alamitos. On 20 July 1950, VF-781 was based at NAS North Island. In January 1951 the squadron moved to NAS Miramar.

VF-781 served on board  with Air Group 102 (CVG-102) flying F9F-2B Panthers from 10 May to 17 December 1951. VF-781's next cruise was on board  flying with Air Group 102 (CVG-102) flying F9F-5's over Korea from 15 September 1952 to 18 May 1953. On 18 November 1952, VF-781 scored its first MiG-15 kills by Royce Williams, John Middleton and Rowlans by 20mm guns in the F9F-5's.

VF-781 was re-designated VF-121 on 4 February 1953. The last cruise was on board  from 19 April to 17 October 1957.

Commander R. E. 'Dusty' Rhodes was CO of VF-121 during 1955, he was a former Commanding Officer of the Blue Angels flight team from 1947 to 1950. Rhodes worked with VC-6 and their AJ Savage tankers on air-to-air refueling. The exercise was successfully tested off the coast of San Diego.

Training Squadron
The first West Coast F4H Phantom Squadron was assigned to VF-121 at NAS Miramar. VF-121 received the first examples of F-4B Phantoms in 1961. On 24 May 1961, Project LANA - the 50th Anniversary of Naval Aviation Transcontinental Race for the Bendix Trophy, was won by a VF-121 crew. Aircrews came from other aircraft types and became qualified in the flight, navigation, and operation of the F4H Phantom. Maintainers came from other squadrons and 'A' schools to learn the Phantom as well. Gunnery and weapons training was obtained while deployed to MCAS Yuma. Carrier Field Landing Practice (FCLP). Their skills were graded by a Landing Signals Office (LSO) the same way as on a carrier. Once qualified they could advance to actual carrier day/ night launch/ recovery qualifications. After this training, the aircrews were assigned to a fleet squadron and sea duty.

Top Gun
The original United States Navy Strike Fighter Tactics Instructor program, more popularly known worldwide as Top Gun, started in March 1969 under VF-121 control.

Home port assignments
The squadron was assigned to these home ports:
 NAS North Island
 NAS Miramar

Aircraft assignment
 Grumman F6F Hellcat
 Chance-Vought F4U Corsair
 Grumman F9F-2/-5 Panther, tail code D
 Grumman F9F-6/-8 Cougar, tail code D
 North American FJ-3 Fury, tail code D
 McDonnell F3H Demon, tail code NJ
 Grumman F11F Tiger, tail code NJ
 McDonnell F-4B/J Phantom II, tail code NJ

Commanding officers
 VF-781
 LCDR Collin I. Overland      – 1 Jul 1946 to 1952
 LCDR Stan R. Holm            – 1952 to 1954

 VF-121  
 CDR J. E. Savage             – 1954
 CDR Jereme H. 'Dusty' Rhodes – 1954 to 1956   
 CDR T. S. Sedaker            – 1956 to 1957  [ Has 2 kills to credit]
 CDR Gerald O'Rourke       - 1964 to Apr 1965
 CDR Timothy R. O'Neil        - Apr 65 to 14 Mar 1966 
 CDR Scott S. Lamoreaux       - 14 Mar 66 to 23 Jun 1967
 CDR Marland W. Townsend, Jr. - 23 Jun 67 to 14 Jun 1968
 CDR Henry L. Halleland       – 14 Jun 68 to 30 Sep 1969
 CDR Richard Schulte          – 30 Sep 19 to 15 Jul 1970 [Helped start Top Gun]
 CDR Billy D. Franklin        - 15 July 70 to 28 May 1971
 CDR Donald B. Pringle        - 15 May 71 to  20 Dec 1971
 CDR James F. Dorsey, Jr.     - 20 Dec 71 to 22 Feb  1972
 CDR Russell E. Davis         - 22 Feb 72 to 31 Aug 1973
 CDR Alvin S. Newman          - 31 Aug 73 to 16 Dec 1974
 CDR James F. Dorsey          - 16 Dec 74 to        1975
 CDR Dennis  Brooks           - 75 to 1 Jun 1976
 CDR Chuck McGill             - Jun 76 to 1977    
 CDR Frank Mezzadri           – Jun 1978 to 1979
 CDR Phillip Anselmo          – 1979 to Sept 1980

See also
 History of the United States Navy
 List of inactive United States Navy aircraft squadrons
 List of United States Navy aircraft squadrons

References

Bibliography

 Eden, Paul ed. The Encyclopedia of Modern Military Aircraft. London: Amber Books Ltd, 2004. 
 Journey to Command. The Naval Career of Captain J.C. Smith: by Carol Smith.  Booksurge.com
 Scream of Eagles. by Robert K. Wilcox.  Pocket Star Books
 Top Gun an American Story, by New York, Boston 2019 
 TopGun Days by Dave "Bio" Baranek, Skyhorse Publishing 2010 
 TopGun the Legacy The complete History of TopGun and its Impact on Tactical Aviation, by Brad Elward Schiffer Military Atglen, Pa. 2021

External links
 F-4J
 FJ-3M Fury
 F-4J History
 F9F

 Strike fighter squadrons of the United States Navy